Nationalist Social Club-131 or NSC-131 is a neo-Nazi organization; the letters 131 stand for ACA or "Anti-Communist Action". It was founded in 2019 in eastern Massachusetts by Chris Hood, who had previously tried other neo-fascist groups such as Patriot Front, the Proud Boys, and the Base. The group first attracted the attention of anti-extremism researchers during the George Floyd protests in mid-2020, which NSC-131 members hoped to leverage to increase their recruiting. Along with the Patriot Front, NSC-131 is one of the most active white nationalist groups in New England as of 2022.

Actions
Members of the group were arrested for participating in the January 6 United States Capitol attack and increased its membership by 250 people in the wake of the attack. According to NSC-131, the group provided security to Super Happy Fun America, although the latter group disclaimed any ties with NSC-131.

In March 2022, it attracted attention by bringing signs to the Boston Saint Patrick's Day parade stating "keep Boston Irish". The group was condemned by the parade's organizer and local politicians including the mayor of Boston, Michelle Wu. The Dropkick Murphys condemned the unlicensed use of their song, "The Boys are Back", in a 2022 music video produced by NSC-131 and threatened legal action in a cease and desist letter. Additionally, the Dropkick Murphys challenged NSC-131 to a street brawl on March 26 at Medal of Honor Park. NSC-131 did not attend. 

In June and July 2022, the group spread fliers around towns such as Hamilton, Ipswich, and Topsfield, Massachusetts.

References

External links
Profile at the Counter Extremism Project

2019 establishments in Massachusetts
Groups and movements involved with the January 6 United States Capitol attack
New England
Neo-Nazi organizations in the United States
White American culture in Massachusetts